is the second album by Japanese artist Kotoko. It was released June 8, 2005.

Track listing

2005 albums
Kotoko (singer) albums